The 17th World Science Fiction Convention (Worldcon), also known as Detention, was held on 4–7 September 1959 at the Pick Fort Shelby Hotel in Detroit, Michigan, United States.

The chairmen were Roger Sims and Fred Prophet.

Participants 

Attendance was 371.

Guests of Honor 

 Poul Anderson (pro)
 John Berry (fan)
 Isaac Asimov (toastmaster, "...with the assistance of Robert Bloch")

Awards

1959 Hugo Awards 

The winners were:

 Best Novel: A Case of Conscience, by James Blish
 Best Novelette: "The Big Front Yard", by Clifford D. Simak
 Best Short Story: "That Hell-Bound Train", by Robert Bloch
 Best SF or Fantasy Movie: no winner chosen
 Best Professional Magazine: The Magazine of Fantasy & Science Fiction, edited by Anthony Boucher and Robert P. Mills
 Best Professional Artist: Frank Kelly Freas
 Best Fanzine: Fanac, edited by Terry Carr and Ron Ellik
 Best New Author of 1958: no winner chosen

See also 

 Hugo Award
 Science fiction
 Speculative fiction
 World Science Fiction Society
 Worldcon

References

External links 

 NESFA.org: 1959 convention notes 

1959 conferences
1959 in Michigan
1959 in the United States
Culture of Detroit
Science fiction conventions in the United States
Worldcon